Elections to Knowsley Metropolitan Borough Council were held on 1 May 2003.  One third of the council was up for election and the Labour Party kept overall control of the council. Overall turnout was 20.7%.

After the election, the composition of the council was:
Labour 55
Liberal Democrat 11

Election result

2 Labour councillors were uncontested.

Ward results

References

2003
2003 English local elections
2000s in Merseyside